United Socialist Alignment of Greece  is a former Greek political party founded in 1984 by Stathis Panagoulis a former member of Panhellenic Socialist Movement.

It took part in the European Parliament election, 1984. The party received only 8,282 votes and gained 0.14%. In the elections of 1985 United Socialist Alignment of Greece collaborated with the Communist Party of Greece and Stathis Panagoulis elected as MP.

In 1989, the party participated in Synaspismós, a coalition of left-wing and progressive political parties. After the elections of 1989, Panagoulis dissolved his party.

Defunct socialist parties in Greece
1984 establishments in Greece